Madise may refer to:
Madise, Harju County, village in Padise Parish, Harju County
Madise, Tartu County, village in Kambja Parish, Tartu County
Madise, Võru County, village in Antsla Parish, Võru County
Adrian Madise (born 1980), American football wide receiver
Nyovani Madise, Malawian economist